Plays More Blues, Ballads & Favorites is a 2011 release by Texas blues guitarist/singer Jimmie Vaughan. It was released by Shout! Factory and Proper Records. It was his second consecutive album featuring only cover songs, the follow up to his 2010 album Plays Blues, Ballads & Favorites.

Personnel
Vaughan plays guitar on all tracks and sings on all, except the instrumental "Greenbacks". Lou Ann Barton duets with Vaughan on "No Use Knocking", "Breaking Up Is Hard to Do" and "I'm in the Mood for You".

George Rains - drums
Ronnie James - bass
Greg Piccolo - tenor saxophone
Doug James - baritone saxophone

Billy Pitman plays rhythm guitar on all tracks, except "Breaking Up Is Hard to Do" which features Derek O'Brien on rhythm guitar.

The album was produced by Jimmie Vaughan.

Track listing
The information below applies to Shout! Factory CD #826663-12722. The Proper Records release - a double album (#PRP LP 083), and the CD (#PRPCD083), both include 2 extra songs, "Bad Bad Whiskey" and "Shake a Hand"

References

2011 albums
Blues albums by American artists